"Hole in a Bottle" is a song co-written and recorded by American country music singer Canaan Smith. Smith co-wrote the song with Brett Beavers and Dan Couch. It was released on August 17, 2015 as Smith's third single and the second single from a self-titled extended play released by Mercury Nashville on March 24, 2015. It was also included on Smith's debut album, Bronco, released on June 23, 2015.

Content
The song uses various forms of "holes" to describe its narrator, who is drinking alcoholic beverages when heartbroken. An uncredited review in Taste of Country described the song as a "rowdy country-rocker that finds the singer wallowing in self-pity, much to his fans’ enjoyment." Smith told the same publication that he wrote the song with the intention of having a song which his fans could sing along to in concert.

Critical reception
In a review of Smith's self-titled EP, Bill Caruthers of Country Standard Time criticized the song for its use of a drum machine instead of normal drums, but otherwise found the lyrical and vocal content favorably comparable to the work of David Lee Murphy.

Chart performance

Weekly charts

Year-end charts

References 

2014 songs
2015 singles
Canaan Smith songs
Mercury Nashville singles
Songs written by Brett Beavers
Song recordings produced by Brett Beavers
Songs written by Canaan Smith
Music videos directed by Chris Hicky
Songs written by Dan Couch